The Strade Bianche Donne (Strade Bianche Women), also named Strade Bianche Rosa by Italian media, is an annual professional women's road bicycle racing event in Tuscany, Italy. Roughly a quarter of the route is raced on white gravel roads – unpaved country lanes winding through the countryside of the Chianti region – from which the event gets its name.

First held in 2015, the race is part of the UCI Women's World Tour, cycling's top-tier female elite competition. It is organized on the same day as the men's race, on the first or second Saturday of March, on much of the same roads but at a shorter distance. Dutch rider Annemiek van Vleuten was the first to win twice, with victories at the 2019 and 2020 races.

History
The first women's Strade Bianche was organized in 2015, following the success of the men's event, which was created in 2007. The inaugural edition was won by American Megan Guarnier after distancing her teammate Lizzie Armitstead and Italian Elisa Longo Borghini during the final stretches of the race.

In 2016, the event was upgraded to UCI World Tour level, the highest level of international women's cycling. Britain's Lizzie Armitstead won the race in the rainbow jersey as ruling world road champion. Elisa Longo Borghini won the third edition in 2017, becoming the first Italian winner of the Strade Bianche.

The 2018 race was run in abysmal weather, with cold temperatures and heavy rainfall making the gravel roads exceptionally muddy. Ruling Olympic road race champion Anna van der Breggen won the edition after a 17 km solo attack. Van der Breggen held a one-minute lead on Poland's Kasia Niewiadoma, who finished second for the third consecutive year. Only 59 of 136 starters finished the race and 17 women arrived outside of the time limit.

Route

The Strade Bianche starts and finishes in Siena, crossing the southern half of the province of Siena in Tuscany. The race is run over 136 km on undulating terrain and is characterized by the presence of white gravel roads; unpaved country lanes winding through the hills and vineyards of the Chianti region. There are eight sectors of gravel in varying lengths and difficulty, totalling 30 km of dirt roads.

The first edition started in San Gimignano and finished in Siena, both UNESCO World Heritage Sites. The inaugural race was run over a distance of 103 km  and featured five gravel sectors, totalling 17 km of strade bianche. In 2016, the start of the race moved to Siena. The total distance was increased to 121 km, including 22.4 km of dirt roads spread over seven sectors. Six sectors were in common with the men's route.

In 2018, an extra gravel sector was added, bringing the total to 30 km of dirt roads on eight sectors, covering a total race distance of 136 km. The longest strada bianca is the 9.5 km sector of San Martino in Grania. The most notorious is the four-starred sector of Colle Pinzuto, at 20 km from the finish. The final gravel sector is in Le Tolfe, just northeast of Siena, after which 12 km remain to the finish. The final kilometre is on the roughly-paved Via Santa Caterina in the heart of the medieval city. The narrow ascent contains steep sections of 16% followed by a short descent and a flat finish on Siena's illustrious Piazza del Campo.

Winners

Wins per country

References

Strade Bianche
UCI Women's World Tour races
Recurring sporting events established in 2007
Cycle races in Italy